Edith Weston is a village and civil parish in the county of Rutland in the East Midlands of England. The population of the civil parish was 1,042 at the 2001 census, including Normanton and increasing to 1,359 at the 2011 census.  It is on the south-eastern shore of Rutland Water and is home of the main sailing club and a fishing lodge. The village is named after Edith of Wessex (1029–1075), the queen of Edward the Confessor and sister of Harold Godwinson.

The Grade I listed church is dedicated to St Mary the Virgin and includes stained glass by Paul Woodroffe and Hugh Arnold; the organ is by Samuel Green of London and dated 1787.

The village pub is the Wheatsheaf on King Edward's Way.

St George's Barracks is located to the south and east of the village; this was previously RAF North Luffenham. In August 2007 16th Regiment Royal Artillery, equipped with the Rapier FSC, moved here from Woolwich.

Edith Weston features in the Alan Sillitoe novel Down From the Hill, with the main character stopping off in the Wheatsheaf for a shandy.

Edith Weston Hall
Edith Weston Hall was a former country house built in an Elizabethan style by the architect Lewis Vulliamy for the Rev. Richard Lucas in 1830, replacing the Old Hall which stood near the church. He died in 1846 and was succeeded by his son Richard Lucas, High Sheriff of Rutland for 1847, who passed it on to his brother George Vere Lucas, who took the surname of Braithwaite under the terms of a will. His son Major Ernest Lucas Braithwaite (also High Sheriff in 1902) sold the estate in 1904 to his nephew, Stafford Vere Hotchkin. In 1913 the latter sold the estate lands by auction and then in 1922 sold the Hall and Park to F. T. Walker of Norton Lees, Derbyshire, although the hall had been destroyed by fire in 1920. He sold them in 1924 to T. J. Burrowes, who sold them to Lieut.-Col. Francis Henry Hardy, who restored the hall in 1924 as the residence of the Hardy family. It was demolished in 1954.

See also
Edith Weston Priory

References

External links

 Village website
 RutNet

Villages in Rutland
British country houses destroyed in the 20th century
Civil parishes in Rutland